Sheetal Thakur Massey is an Indian actress who primarily works in Hindi films and web shows. She made her acting debut with the Punjabi film Bambukat in 2016, for which she received Filmfare Awards Punjabi Best Supporting Actress nomination. She made her Hindi film debut with Brij Mohan Amar Rahe in 2018.

Thakur is known for her role in the films Chappad Phaad Ke, Shukranu and the web series Broken But Beautiful.

Early life
Thakur was born on 13 November 1991 in Dharamshala, Himachal Pradesh. She completed her graduation from University of Delhi. She participated in Femina Miss Himachal Pradesh during her college days and won 'Miss Beautiful Smile' title.

Personal life
Thakur and Vikrant Massey began dating in 2015, before they together starred in Broken But Beautiful. They got engaged in November 2019.

They registered their marriage on 14 February 2022 in an intimate ceremony at their Versova home. On 18 February 2022, Thakur and Massey got married in a traditional ceremony in Himachal Pradesh.

Career
Thakur made her acting debut in 2016 with the Punjabi film Bambukat, for which she received Filmfare Awards Punjabi Best Supporting Actress nomination. In 2017, she appeared in the short film Dark Brew alongside Vinay Pathak.

Thakur made her Hindi film debut in 2018 with Brij Mohan Amar Rahe opposite Arjun Mathur which released on Netflix. The same year she made her web debut with Viu's Banned and appeared in Season 1 of ALT Balaji's Broken But Beautiful opposite Vikrant Massey.

In 2019 she appeared in the Hindi films, the Disney+ Hotstar original, Chappad Phaad Ke and the Netflix original, Upstarts. She then appeared in an episode of Voot's Fuh se Fantasy and also reprised her role in Season 2 of ALT Balaji's Broken But Beautiful.

She next appeared in the 2020 ZEE5 film Shukranu opposite Divyenndu and in the 2021 film Dilphire opposite Karan Kundra.

Filmography

Films
 All films are in Hindi unless otherwise noted.

Web series

Music videos

Awards and nominations

References

External links

1991 births
Living people
Indian film actresses
21st-century Indian actresses